Zobera Rahman Linu is a Bangladeshi table tennis player. She won a record 16 national championships during 1979–2001. She is the recipient of Bangladesh National Sports Award (1999) in the table tennis category.

Early life and education 
Linu grew up in Sylhet at Shahzibazar. She passed SSC from Rosulpur school of Narsingdi District. She completed her HSC and BA from Lalmatia Girls College in Dhaka. She later earned her master's in psychology from Jagannath College.

Career
Linu started playing when she was 8 years old. In 1977, she won the championships in singles, doubles and mixed doubles. She won 16 national championships during 1979–2001. She stood 5th in 1980's Asian Table Tennis Championship which took place in Japan.

Linu participated at the World Table Tennis Championships in 1977 and 2000.

Linu served as the Goodwill Ambassador for UNICEF in Bangladesh.

Notes and references

Living people
1965 births
People from Khulna District
Bangladeshi female table tennis players
Recipients of the Bangladesh National Sports Award